Mirela Corjeutanu  (born ) is a retired Romanian female volleyball player, who played as a universal.

Corjeutanu also competed at the 2001 Women's European Volleyball Championship, 2003 Women's European Volleyball Championship and 2005 Women's European Volleyball Championship. 
She was part of the Romania women's national volleyball team at the 2002 FIVB Volleyball Women's World Championship in Germany. On club level she played with Futura Volley Sanarate.

Clubs
 Futura Volley Sanarate (2002)

References

1977 births
Living people
Romanian women's volleyball players
Place of birth missing (living people)